Margaret Elizabeth "Libby" Villari (née Webb; born November 17, 1951) is an American actress. She is best known for her recurring role as Mayor Lucy Rodell on Friday Night Lights. Her film appearances include Boyhood, Infamous, What's Eating Gilbert Grape, Boys Don't Cry, and The Faculty.

Personal life
Born Margaret Elizabeth Webb in North Carolina, she grew up in California, later moving to Texas. Her mother was Peggy Lee (née Walters; 1931–2004) and her father was Roy Frank Webb (1924–1973). She graduated from University of North Texas with a B.A in Theatre. An active performer in the Texas theatre community, she often acts in productions that film in Texas. She is a breast cancer survivor. She has a son named Lyn William Villari and 2 grandchildren.

Career
Villari made her television debut in the 1985 television movie Stormin' Home and followed this with Adam: His Song Continues and the Emmy-nominated television film Little Girl List with Tess Harper. In 1986 she played Mrs. Pritchard in Bonnie & Clyde: The True Story. She made her film debut in 1993 as Camille McCloud in My Boyfriend's Back, also (Matthew McConaughey's first film). She next appeared in Flesh and Bone, as a reporter in Clint Eastwood's A Perfect World, and in the 1994 television film Without Consent.

In 1995, she appeared in The Big Green and in 1996 in Children of the Corn IV: The Gathering and The Whole Wide World as the mother of Renée Zellweger. She has also appeared on the series Walker, Texas Ranger and in Robert Altman's Dr. T & the Women.

In 2014, Villari's film Boyhood by Richard Linklater opened at the Sundance Film Festival. She plays the mother of Patricia Arquette's character in the film. It was nominated for 6 Oscars including Best Picture at the 87th Academy Awards.

On stage she has acted in several productions with the Stage West Theatre Company, including her breakout role as Honey Bruce in Lenny, and with the Hip Pocket Theatre, including Widows by Ariel Dorfman.
Since 2017 she has toured regional theaters around the country portraying former Texas governor Ann Richards in the one-woman play ANN by Holland Taylor.
Villari is also an acting coach and works with children's literacy programs.

Filmography

Film

Television

References

External links
 

Living people
American film actresses
American television actresses
1951 births
Actresses from North Carolina
Actresses from Texas
University of North Texas alumni
20th-century American actresses
21st-century American actresses
Actresses from California